Clavulina hispidulosa is a species of coral fungus in the family Clavulinaceae. Described as new to science in 1956, it occurs in India.

References

External links

Fungi described in 1956
Fungi of Asia
hispidulosa